The Dublin and Wrightsville Railroad was built in 1886 and ran  between the cities of Dublin and Wrightsville in the American state of Georgia.  It was almost immediately acquired by the Wrightsville and Tennille Railroad upon its completion.

Defunct Georgia (U.S. state) railroads
Predecessors of the Central of Georgia Railway
Railway companies established in 1885
Railway companies disestablished in 1886